Praseodymium diiodide is a chemical compound with the empirical formula of PrI2, consisting of praseodymium and iodine. It is an electride, with the ionic formula of Pr3+(I−)2e−, and therefore not a true praseodymium(II) compound.

Preparation 
Praseodymium diiodide can be obtained by reacting praseodymium(III) iodide with metallic praseodymium at 800 °C to 900 °C in an inert atmosphere:
Pr + 2 PrI3 → 3 PrI2

It can also be obtained by reacting praseodymium with mercury(II) iodide where praseodymium displaces mercury:

Pr + HgI2 + PrI2 + Hg

Praseodymium diiodide was first obtained by John D. Corbett in 1961.

Properties 
Praseodymium diiodide is an opaque, bronze-coloured solid with a metallic lustre that is soluble in water. The lustre and very high conductivity can be explained by the formulation {PrIII,2I−,e−}, with one electron per metal centre delocalised in a conduction band.

The compound is extremely hygroscopic, and can only be stored and handled under carefully dried inert gas or under a high vacuum. In air it converts into hydrates by absorbing moisture, but these are unstable and more or less rapidly transform into oxide iodides with the evolution of hydrogen:

2PrI2 + 2H2O → 2PrOI + H2↑ + 2HI

With water, these processes take place much faster.

Praseodymium diiodide has five crystal structures, namely the MoSi2 structure, the hexagonal MoS2 structure, the trigonal MoS2 structure, the cadmium chloride structure and the spinel structure. Praseodymium diiodide with the cadmium chloride structure belongs to the trigonal crystal system, with the space group Rm (No. 166), lattice parameters a = 426.5 pm and c = 2247,1 pm; however, the spinel structure of praseodymium diiodide is cubic, with space group F3 (No. 216), and lattice parameter a = 1239.9 pm.

References 

Praseodymium compounds
Iodides
Lanthanide halides
Electrides
Substances discovered in the 1960s